Vannoy is a surname. Notable people with the surname include:

Henry Vannoy (1819–1889), French actor and playwright
Henry Clay VanNoy (1881–1938), American businessman
Robin Ransom Vannoy (born 1967), American judge

See also
Van Noy

English-language surnames